This timeline outlines the key developments in the United Kingdom electricity industry from the start of electricity supplies in the 1870s to the present day. It identifies significant developments in technology for the generation, transmission and use of electricity; outlines developments in the structure of the industry including key organisations and facilities; and records the legislation and regulations that have governed the UK electricity industry.  

The first part is a chronological table of significant events; the second part is a list of local acts of Parliament (1879–1948) illustrating the growth of electricity supplies.

Significant events 
The following is a list of significant events in the history of the electricity sector in the United Kingdom.

Local legislation timeline 
In addition to the Public General Acts on electricity supply given in the above table, there were also Local Acts. The Electric Lighting Acts 1882 to 1909 permitted local authorities and companies to apply to the Board of Trade for provisional orders and licences to supply electricity. The orders were confirmed by local Electric Lighting Orders Confirmation Acts. Local authorities and companies could also obtain Local Acts for electricity supply. A sample of Local Acts is given in the table below. Note that Local Acts have a chapter number for the relevant year in lower-case Roman numerals.

See also
 Energy policy of the United Kingdom
 Energy use and conservation in the United Kingdom
 Energy switching services in the UK

References

Sources
 Cochrane, R. and Schaefer, M. (1990). The CEGB Story.  London, CEGB.
 
 
 Electricity Council (1987). Electricity Supply in the United Kingdom: A Chronology. London, Electricity Council. 
  — explains the 1882 Act
 
 Hannah, Leslie (1982). Engineers, Managers and Politicians. London, Macmillan.  
 Luckin, Bill. (1990). Questions of Power: Electricity and the Environment in Inter-war Britain. Manchester, University Press. 
 Pedroche, Ben (2013). London's Lost Power Stations and Gasworks. Stroud, The History Press. 
 Sheail, John (1991). Power in Trust: The Environmental History of the Central Electricity Generating Board. Oxford, Clarendon. 
  — "Postnote" 163

Electricity supply industry
Electric power in the United Kingdom
History of electrical engineering
Electricity